Sahray may refer to various places in Iran:
 Sahray-e Bid
 Sahray-e Bugal
 Sahray-e Nimeh

See also
 Sohray (disambiguation), various places in Iran